Zafaran may refer to:
 Zafaran, Kermanshah, Iran
 Zafaran-e Olya, village in Kermanshah Province, Iran
 Zafaran-e Sofla, village in Kermanshah Province, Iran
 Zafaran, Qazvin, Iran
 Zaafrane, Tunisia
 Zəfəran, Azerbaijan
 Zəfəran, Afghanistan

See also
 Za'faran (disambiguation)

zafaran afghanistan